Gävleborg County or Region Gävleborg held a regional council election on 9 September 2018, on the same day as the general and municipal elections.

Results
The number of seats remained at 75 with the Social Democrats winning the most at 24, a drop of two from 2014.

Municipalities

Images

References

Elections in Gävleborg County
Gävleborg